Hlib Oleksandrovych Savchuk (born 17 February 2003) is a Ukrainian professional football defender who plays for Rukh Lviv.

Career
Born in Khmelnytskyi, Savchuk is a product of the local Podillya Khmelnytskyi (where his first coach was Oleksandr Irkliyenko) and Karpaty Lviv academies.

He played for Karpaty Lviv in the Ukrainian Second League and in February 2021 he was transferred to another team from Lviv – Rukh, and made his debut for FC Rukh as the start squad player in the away winning match against MFC Mykolaiv on 21 September 2021 in the Round of 32 of the Ukrainian Cup.

References

External links
 
 

2003 births
Living people
Sportspeople from Khmelnytskyi, Ukraine
Ukrainian footballers
Ukraine youth international footballers
Association football defenders
Ukrainian Second League players
FC Karpaty Lviv players
FC Rukh Lviv players